The Liberty Bridge is a bascule-type drawbridge located in Bay City, Michigan, United States.  It spans the Saginaw River and connects Vermont Street (on the west side of the river) and Woodside Avenue (on the east side).  It was built in 1986. In 2023 a toll will be charged for most vehicles.

History

The Liberty Bridge was built to replace the Third Street Bridge, a small swing bridge located just south of the Liberty Bridge connecting Midland and Third Streets.  The Third Street Bridge was the first bridge built across the Saginaw River in Bay City.  It was originally built as a wooden bridge in 1864 by the Bay City Bridge Company.  Its superstructure was reconstructed with iron and steel in 1872.

On June 18, 1976, the swing span of the Third Street Bridge collapsed as it was being opened, forcing the bridge out of service permanently.  It had been struck by a vessel the evening before.  A debate ensued on where to build a replacement bridge.  In order to receive federal funding, the new bridge was required to have four lanes. A four-lane bridge at the same site would have necessitated the demolition of some historic buildings.  As a result, the Liberty Bridge was built just north of the old bridge site, connecting Woodside Avenue and Vermont Street.

References

External links

 Bridge schedule
 Third Street Bridge

Bridges completed in 1986
Bascule bridges in the United States
Towers in Michigan
Buildings and structures in Bay County, Michigan
Transportation in Bay County, Michigan
Bay City, Michigan
Road bridges in Michigan
Saginaw River
Metal bridges in the United States